Office Gossip is a British sitcom that aired on BBC One in 2001. Starring Pauline Quirke, it was written by Paul Mayhew-Archer, who co-wrote The Vicar of Dibley, and George Pritchett.

Recently, it has been aired in the United States on various PBS stations as part of 'One Season Wonders.

Cast
Pauline Quirke – Jo Thomas
Robert Daws – Rod Battle
Neil Stuke – Simon
Pippa Haywood – Maxine Wells
Daniela Denby-Ashe – Cheryl Potts
Charlotte Francis – Sam Thomas

Plot
Set in the office Tippins Toys Ltd, Office Gossip concentrates on the love lives of Jo Thomas and Simon, who sit opposite each other. Jo is a single mother, her daughter is eleven-year-old Sam, and is the hardworking PA to Rod Battle. Battle, a workaholic whose wife is on the verge of leaving him, confides in Jo and she clearly harbours feelings for him. Meanwhile, Simon is having an affair with his boss, Maxine, a married woman. Both of these relationships, especially Jo and Rod's, become the subject of gossip in the office, often led by Cheryl.

Episodes

Title song
The title song was sung by Daniela Denby-Ashe and Jenna Russell.

Reception
Office Gossip, despite having a good cast and prime time slot of Friday at 9pm on BBC One, did not receive positive reviews and was pulled after only one series. The first episode received 6.6 million viewers, but by the sixth episode only 4.4 million people tuned in.

References

Mark Lewisohn, "Radio Times Guide to TV Comedy", BBC Worldwide Ltd, 2003
British TV Comedy Guide for Office Gossip
BBC Programs Office Gossip page

External links

2001 British television series debuts
2001 British television series endings
2000s British sitcoms
BBC television sitcoms
2000s British workplace comedy television series